Franco Micheli was an Italian sports shooter. He competed in three events at the 1920 Summer Olympics. He also competed at the 1906 Intercalated Games.

References

External links
 

Year of birth missing
Year of death missing
Italian male sport shooters
Olympic shooters of Italy
Shooters at the 1906 Intercalated Games
Shooters at the 1920 Summer Olympics
Place of birth missing